Holmsen is a Norwegian surname. Notable people with the surname include:

Andreas Holmsen (1906–1989), Norwegian historian
Bjørn Holmsen (born 1948), Norwegian entrepreneur
Borghild Holmsen (1865–1938), Norwegian pianist, music critic and composer
Eivind Holmsen (1894–1990), Norwegian professional sports shooter
Hanna Resvoll-Holmsen (1873–1943), Norwegian botanist
Øivind Holmsen (1912–1996), Norwegian international footballer
Sverre Holmsen (1906–1992), Swedish author

Norwegian-language surnames